Sclerodactylidae is a family of sea cucumbers, marine invertebrates with elongated bodies, leathery skins and tentacles.

Members of the family are characterised by the complex ring of ossicles they have near the anterior end. These may or may not take the form of a short tube but are quite unlike the long tubes found in the phyllophorids. The tentacles number ten to twenty.

Genera
The World Register of Marine Species recognizes the following genera:
 genus Afrocucumis Deichmann, 1944
 genus Apentamera Deichmann, 1941
 genus Athyone Deichmann, 1941
 genus Cladolabes Brandt, 1835
 genus Clarkiella Heding in Heding & Panning, 1954
 genus Coronatum Martins & Souto in Martins, Souto & Menegola, 2012
 genus Deichmannia Cherbonnier, 1958
 genus Engeliella Cherbonnier, 1968
 genus Eupentacta Deichmann, 1938
 genus Euthyonidiella Heding & Panning, 1954
 genus Globosita Cherbonnier, 1958
 genus Havelockia Pearson, 1903
 genus Neopentamera Deichmann, 1941
 genus Neothyone Deichmann, 1941
 genus Ohshimella Heding & Panning, 1954
 genus Pachythyone Deichmann, 1941
 genus Pseudothyone Panning, 1949
 genus Sclerodactyla Ayres, 1851
 genus Sclerothyone Thandar, 1989
 genus Temparena Thandar, 1989
 genus Thandarum Martinez & Brogger, 2012

See also
Sclerodactyla briareus

References

 
Echinoderm families